Timur Kapadze is an Uzbekistani former professional football midfielder of Ahiska-Turkish descent.

Early life
Of Turkish Meskhetian descent, he is the son of Takhir Kapadze — a football coach and was a pupil of Ferghan football, the city of his relatives. Takhir Kapadze came from a family of Georgian Turks who suffered forced deportation by the Soviet authorities to Central Asia during the World War II.

Club career

He began his professional career in 1998 as a member of Neftchi Ferghana. He played for Neftchi Ferghana to the end of 2001. During this time, the signal part of the club's 14 matches and managed to score two goals. Together with Neftchi Ferghana, he won the gold medals of the Uzbekistan Higher League in 2001, and in the season of 1998, 1999 and 2000 silver medals of the country championship.

In 2002 he moved to Pakhtakor from Tashkent. Together with the Tashkent club six times in a row became the champion of Uzbekistan, and also six times in a row won the Uzbekistan Cup. In 2007, he won the Commonwealth Champions Cup. In addition, in 2003 and 2004 he reached the AFC Champions League semi-finals with Pakhtakor. Until the end of 2007 he played for Pakhtakor, and was one of its leaders. In total, he played 152 matches in Pakhtakor and scored 28 goals.

In early 2008, he joined the new giant of Uzbekistan football — Bunyodkor. As player of Bunyodkor Kapadze also became one of the leaders of the team. In those years, Bunyodkor was able to attract the strongest players of his sworn rival - Pakhtakor, in addition to Timur Kapadze, players such as Server Djeparov, Ignatiy Nesterov and Anzur Ismailov, as well as a number of foreign legionaries, such as Brazilians Rivaldo and other Brazilians players. Together with Bunyodkor Kapadze three times in a row became the champion of Uzbekistan, twice won the Uzbekistan Cup, once won silver medals of the Uzbekistan Cup. In addition, in 2008 he reached the semi-finals of the AFC Champions League. He played for Bunyodkor until the end of 2010, and during this time he played for the club 70 games and scored 11 goals.

In February 2011, Timur Kapadze moved to South Korean Incheon United, which he played until the end of the season. He played 28 matches and scored four goals. In January 2012 he moved to the club from UAE — Al Sharjah, where he played until June of the same year. During this time he played for the UAE club only nine times.

In June 2012 he moved to Aktobe from Kazakhstan, and played for the club until the end of 2014. As part of Aktobe in 2013 became the champion of Kazakhstan, and in 2014 won the silver medal of the championship of Kazakhstan. In addition, in 2014 he won the Kazakhstan Super Cup.

In January 2015 he returned to Uzbekistan, and has signed a contract with Lokomotiv Tashkent. Together with the Lokomotiv Tashkent twice in a row in the seasons of 2016 and 2017 became the champion of Uzbekistan, and in the season of 2015 won silver medals of the championship of Uzbekistan. Also in 2016 and 2017 won the Uzbekistan Cup, and in 2015 the Uzbekistan Super Cup.

He played for Lokomotiv Tashkent until the end of 2017. In the fall of 2017, he announced the end of his career as a football player at the end of the 2017 season. During Kapadze's performance in Lokomotiv Tashkent, he was his captain. The farewell match of Timur Kapadze took place on December 4, 2017, in the final of the Uzbekistan Cup, in which Lokomotiv Tashkent and Bunyodkor met. The match ended with a score of 1: 0 in favor of Lokomotiv Tashkent. The match was attended by a number of football and sports officials and specialists of Uzbekistan, in particular the President of the Uzbekistan Football Federation Umid Ahmadjanov, as well as the President of the AFC — Salman Bin Ibrahim Al-Khalifa.

At the end of his career as a football player, he announced the beginning of coaching. On February 15, 2018, Kapadze was appointed interim head coach of the Uzbekistan national team.   He holds this position until Héctor Cúper has taken over as head coach in August 2018.

International career
From 2002 to 2015 Timur Kapadze played for the Uzbekistan national team and had participated in four AFC Asian Cup, which is so far, the only Georgian-born player to have competed in international tournaments. His debut match for the national team played on 14 May 2002 in a friendly match against Slovakia. His first goal for the national team of Uzbekistan was scored on November 17, 2003 in the match against Tajikistan. In a short time, Timur Kapadze became one of the leaders of the national team.

He took part with the national team in four final tournaments of the AFC Asian Cup. In 2004, the tournament played four matches (Uzbekistan team reached the quarterfinals), in 2007 — played four matches and scored two goals (Uzbekistan team also reached the quarterfinals), in the Asian Cup in 2011 played six matches and became a semi-finalist of the tournament. In the Asian Cup 2015 played two matches, and the national team of Uzbekistan stopped at the quarterfinals.

Long was the best guard his team from 119 matches, before he was ahead of the Server Jeparov. In addition, Timur Kapadze was one of the Vice-captains of the national team of Uzbekistan, and even in some matches went out on the field with a captain's armband.

Honours

Club
Neftchi
Uzbek League (1): 2001
Uzbek League runners-up (3): 1998, 1999, 2000

Pakhtakor
Uzbek League (6): 2002, 2003, 2004, 2005, 2006, 2007
Uzbek Cup (6): 2002, 2003, 2004, 2005, 2006, 2007
CIS cup: 2007
 AFC Champions League semi-final (2): 2003, 2004

Bunyodkor
Uzbek League (3): 2008, 2009, 2010
Uzbek Cup (2): 2008, 2010
AFC Champions League semi-final (1): 2008

Aktobe
Kazakhstan Premier League (1): 2013
Kazakhstan Premier League runners-up (1): 2014
Kazakhstan Super Cup (1): 2014

Lokomotiv
Uzbekistan Super Cup (1): 2014

National team
AFC Asian Cup semi-final: 2011

Manager
Uzbekistan U23
AFC U-23 Asian Cup runner-up: 2022
Individual
 Uzbekistan Football Coach of the Year: 2022

Career statistics

International goals
Scores and results list Uzbekistan's goal tally first.

See also
List of men's footballers with 100 or more international caps

References

External links

Timur Kapadze- uzfootball.uz

1981 births
Living people
Uzbekistani footballers
Uzbekistani football managers
Uzbekistan international footballers
Uzbekistani expatriate footballers
Uzbekistani people of Georgian descent
Uzbekistani people of Turkish descent
Expatriate footballers in South Korea
Expatriate footballers in the United Arab Emirates
Uzbekistani expatriate sportspeople in South Korea
Uzbekistani expatriate sportspeople in the United Arab Emirates
2004 AFC Asian Cup players
2007 AFC Asian Cup players
2011 AFC Asian Cup players
2015 AFC Asian Cup players
FK Neftchi Farg'ona players
Pakhtakor Tashkent FK players
Meskhetian Turkish people
FC Bunyodkor players
K League 1 players
Incheon United FC players
Kazakhstan Premier League players
FC Aktobe players
Sharjah FC players
People from Fergana
FIFA Century Club
Footballers at the 2006 Asian Games
PFC Lokomotiv Tashkent players
UAE Pro League players
Uzbekistan national football team managers
Association football midfielders
Asian Games competitors for Uzbekistan